WBFY-LP is a low-power, community radio station in Belfast, Maine, United States.  It broadcasts at 100.9 FM from a studio in the basement of a former elementary school, Waterfall Arts on High Street. The range of the signal is 10–20 miles depending on geographic and weather conditions.

History 
The license is held by the City of Belfast, but the station was created and is run by a group of volunteers, called Belfast Community Radio.  This group was put together in a hurry during the fall of 2016, because the construction permit would expire if the station was not on the air by late January 2017. In eight weeks, a fundraising group led by Jennifer Hill and Erik Klausmeyer raised about $40,000 from businesses and individual donations, a foundation grant, and in-kind donations of equipment and furnishings.  Community building events included a potluck with musical acts, an outdoor 'radio studio' for children during Halloween trick-or-treat, and a movie at the Colonial Theater.  Other major players in this early phase were Karen Nelson, Patrick Walsh, Petra Hall and Wylie Fowler.

The station was constructed in early December, 2016, by the technical committee—Pete Dalton, Erik Klausmeyer, Vic Tredwell, Zafra Whitcomb—and many other helpers.  The basement room was soundproofed with donated acoustic tiles.  Equipment was selected, purchased and installed.  The antenna was strapped to the chimney of the building using a metal-banding machine from the transfer station.  A dedicated internet connection was established.

After a brief period of testing, the station launched on December 17, 2016 with a marathon show of live music and interviews from noon until 8pm.  A dozen local music groups appeared in the show, as well as city councilors and other supporters of the station.  After that the 'robot DJ' -- a computer program—took over.  It broadcasts music 24/7, except when human DJ's are training or the station is transmitting prerecorded shows by community members.  The station's second major event was held on New Year's Eve.  Concerts put on by the 20th Annual New Years By The Bay were recorded, and hand carried to the station.  These were broadcast with a one-hour delay, along with good wishes call-ins.  Both of the marathon shows were produced by Vic Tredwell, with help from many volunteers.

Going forward 

The programming committee, led by Karen Nelson and Judi Erickson, is recruiting and training programmers.  Regular music and public service shows will be starting up over the course of January.  The governance committee, led by Zafra Whitcomb and Lane Sturtevant, is working toward bylaws and incorporation.  When these legal structures are in place, the City of Belfast will transfer the license to Belfast Community Radio.

References 

 belfastcommunityradio.org - the station's web site
 WBFY to Start Broadcasting - article by Ethan Andrews from the Republican Journal, Belfast's newspaper
 Community Radio Launch - video by Ned Lightner from "Somewhere In Waldo County", a show on Belfast's public access cable channel
 Hyper-Local Radio - article about the station on the Island Institute website
 WBFY FM radio station to go live with on-air party

More Information 

 

BFY-LP
BFY-LP
Radio stations established in 2016
2016 establishments in Maine
Belfast, Maine
Community radio stations in the United States